Beavis and Butt-Head Do the Universe is a 2022 American adult animated science fiction comedy film directed by John Rice and Albert Calleros and written by Mike Judge, Lew Morton, Guy Maxtone-Graham and Ian Maxtone-Graham. It is the second film based on the animated television series Beavis and Butt-Head after Beavis and Butt-Head Do America (1996). The film follows teenage delinquents Beavis and Butt-Head, who are transported 24 years from 1998 to 2022, encounter parallel-universe versions of themselves and are hunted by the US government.

The film was announced in February 2021. The production was conducted remotely via Zoom conferencing due to the COVID-19 pandemic. The film was released on the streaming service Paramount+ on June 23, 2022, to acclaim from critics.

Plot

In Highland, Texas, in 1998, Beavis and Butt-Head accidentally burn down their high school science fair. Believing they are at-risk youth, a judge sends them to space camp at the Johnson Space Center, where they become engrossed in a docking simulator. Impressed, the NASA astronaut Captain Serena Ryan invites them to train as astronauts, which they mistake as an offer for sex. They undergo training and board the Space Shuttle Endeavour to study a micro black hole.

In space, Beavis and Butt-Head create a catastrophe. When Serena volunteers to sacrifice herself, they mistake this for another offer of sex. They don their spacesuits and watch Serena through a window as she prepares to change. Enraged, Serena uses the shuttle controls to fling them into space, where they are sucked into the black hole.

The boys emerge in Galveston in 2022. The Pentagon detects their arrival and begins tracking them; Serena, now governor of Texas, vows to kill them to cover up her attempted murder. The boys meet intelligent versions of themselves from another universe, Smart Beavis and Smart Butt-Head, who explain that they have two days to enter a portal on top of Mount Everest to prevent the destruction of the multiverse.

Beavis and Butt-Head acquire an iPhone and accidentally activate Siri, which they mistake for Serena; Beavis develops feelings for her. When Siri offers to set up their smart home, they believe Serena is waiting for them in Highland. After Beavis becomes trapped in a port-a-potty, he and Butt-Head are transported to a university. Smart Beavis and Smart Butt-Head urge them to enter the portal, which they have moved nearby, but instead they wander into a gender studies class, where the professor lectures them on white privilege. Taking this to mean they have the right to do whatever they want, they steal a police car and are arrested. In jail, Beavis takes pills given to him by an inmate, transforms into his hyperactive alter ego Cornholio, and incites an uprising. Discovering that the boys seemingly died in 1998, the warden decides that they are angels and releases them.

The boys arrive home, expecting to find Serena, but find it has been placed for sale. They blame each other and separate, but are quickly abducted by government officials. Serena's downtrodden lieutenant, Hartson, covertly frees the boys, saying he knows what Serena did to them. Smart Beavis and Butt-Head urge them to enter the portal, but the boys ignore them.

All parties arrive at Beavis and Butt-Head's house. As Serena is about to shoot them, she realizes they are not her enemies, only foolish teenagers. Smart Beavis and Smart Butt-Head urge Beavis and Butt-Head to enter the portal, but Hartson is accidentally sucked in instead, closing the rift and saving the multiverse. As Beavis attempts to express his love to Serena, Smart Beavis interrupts and offers to show her the cosmos; she leaves with him and Smart Butt-Head. In exchange for their silence, the government gives Beavis and Butt-Head their home back in its original condition. In another universe, the assembled alternative Beavises and Butt-Heads applaud Smart Beavis for becoming the first Beavis to have sex.

Voice cast

Daria Morgendorffer, Tom Anderson, Stewart Stevenson, and Coach Buzzcut make silent cameo appearances.

Production

Development
In 2008, Mike Judge stated, "I like to keep the door open on Beavis and Butt-Head, because it's my favorite thing that I've ever done. It's the thing I'm most proud of." However, he stated his reservations regarding the "year and a half [to] two and a half years" that it would take "to do that right," saying that a revival project "comes up every three years." In 2009, while promoting his film Extract, Judge said he would like to see the characters on the big screen again, and that "I kind of think of them as being either 15 or in their 60s.... I wouldn't mind doing something with them as these two dirty old men sitting on the couch."

In March 2018, Judge told Rotten Tomatoes that the idea of doing a second Beavis and Butt-Head movie had been brought up two months prior, saying "It's just a matter of coming up with an idea that feels like it's worth doing." In July 2019, Judge again reiterated interest in a potential movie, stating, "I've got some ideas. I think it would have to be something that makes it relevant today. I think I might've figured out a way to do that." He further stated that he would probably direct it.

In February 2021, it was announced that a new Beavis and Butt-Head movie was in production for Paramount+, with Judge on board. The news came following the announcement of a revival series the year prior, which was originally set to air on Comedy Central. Originally, Paramount executives wanted a live-action Beavis and Butt-Head movie, with Judge holding auditions over Zoom for the project before eventually talking the company into doing an animated movie instead to reestablish the characters first, with a live-action movie still a possibility. In January 2022, Judge tweeted drawings of older versions of Beavis and Butt-Head. A month later, the film's title was revealed as Beavis and Butt-Head Do the Universe. John Frizzell, who composed Do America, returned to compose the score. The entire production was conducted remotely via Zoom conferencing due to the COVID-19 pandemic.

Animation
While the series and the first film Do America were hand-drawn animated by Rough Draft Studios, animation services for Do the Universe were provided by Titmouse, Inc in Los Angeles, Snipple Animation Studios in the Philippines, and Inspidea in Malaysia using Adobe Animate, making it the first official Beavis and Butt-Head animation to be done digitally. While some layouts where handled by Studio Moshi in Melbourne and Ink Animation in Singapore.

Release
The film's trailer was released on June 2, 2022. A sneak peek debuted three days later, at the MTV Movie and TV Awards. Beavis and Butt-Head Do the Universe was released on Paramount+ on June 23, 2022, and a day later on the UK version of the service. 

The soundtrack was released digitally on July 8, 2022 from Paramount Music.

Reception 
 On Metacritic, the film has a weighted average score of 70 out of 100, based on 19 critics, indicating "generally favorable reviews." Andy Kelly of The Gamer complimented the movie as one of the best movies of the year and a revival done well of which he also noted "Beavis and Butt-Head Do the Universe is a fine return to form for these characters—and for Mike Judge, whose distinctive approach to comedy I've dearly missed". Sol Harris of Starburst Magazine gave the movie 4 out of 5 stars of which he wrote "Beavis and Butt-Head Do the Universe is a completely worthy follow-up to Do America and, frankly, a frontrunner for the title of funniest movie of 2022."

References

External links
 

2020s English-language films
2022 animated films
American adult animated films
Adult animated comedy films
Adult animated science fiction films
American satirical films
Paramount+ original films
2022 comedy films
MTV animated films
MTV Films films
Beavis and Butt-Head films
Films scored by John Frizzell (composer)
Films set in 1998
Films set in 2022
Films set in Texas
Films with screenplays by Mike Judge
White privilege
Animated films about time travel
Black holes in film
Films set in the future
2020s American films